Cavmont Bank Limited is a commercial bank in Zambia. It is licensed by the Bank of Zambia, the central bank and national banking regulator.

Location
The headquarters and main branch of Cavmont Bank Limited are located at 2374 Thabo Mbeki Road, in the city of Lusaka, the capital and largest city in Zambia. The geographical coordinates of the headquarters of the bank are: 15°24'06.0"S, 28°19'20.0"E (Latitude:-15.401667; Longitude:28.322222).

Overview
CBL provides an array of banking services including in the areas of community banking, retail banking, investment, and corporate banking. , the bank was a retail bank with total assets valued at ZMW:946.8 million (US$96.7 million), with shareholders' equity of ZMW:118.1 million (US$12.1 million). At that time the bank employed a total of 245 people. By December 2016, the bank's total assets had increased to ZMW:1,063,735,000.00 (US$108.64 million).

History
The Bank was established on 1 January 2004, following a merger between Cavmont Merchant Bank Limited (incorporated in October 1992), and New Capital Bank Plc., (incorporated in June 1992). In 2006 the Bank's holding company, Cavmont Capital Holdings Zambia Plc (CCHZ), sought a strategic investment partner and identified Capricorn Investment Holdings Limited (CIH). CIH acquired a 44.2% shareholding in CCHZ in 2007.

Discussions held with the Bank of Zambia to find an acceptable manner to recapitalize Cavmont Bank through a rights issue by CCHZ were concluded successfully, with CIH underwriting the rights issue. Consequently, CCHZ raised additional share capital of more than K15.4 billion in 2007 and the re-positioning of Cavmont Bank commenced.

The Bank of Zambia revised capitalization requirements for local Banks and foreign Banks and it is in light of this that the holding company has warehoused 51% shares in Makumbi Investments Limited a special purpose vehicle earmarked for forward offer to local investors. As of 31 December 2013, the Bank has met the equity shareholding and capital requirements for local banks.

Ownership
Cavmont Bank Limited is a 100 percent subsidiary of Cavmont Capital Holdings Zambia Plc. (CCHZ). The investors in CCHZ, and therefore in CBL, include Capricorn Investment Holdings (CIH), a financial conglomerate with investment interests in three Southern African countries: Botswana, Namibia and Zambia. CIH owns controlling interests in Bank Gaborone in Botswana and Bank Windhoek in Namibia, in addition to its minority shareholding in Cavmont Capital Holdings Zambia Plc. The stock of the holding company, CCHZ, is Listed on the Lusaka Stock Exchange (LUSE), where it trades under the symbol: CCHZ. The shareholding in CCHZ and therefore in CBL is depicted in the table below:

Branch Network
As of May 2018, Cavmont Bank maintained a network of branches at the locations:

 Head Office: Cavmont House, Piziya Office Park, 2374 Thabo Mbeki Road, Lusaka 
 Makumbi Commercial Branch: Cavmont House, Piziya Office Park, 2374 Thabo Mbeki Road, Lusaka
 Lusaka Square Branch: Anchor House, Sapele Road, Lusaka
 Tazara Branch: Ground Floor, Tazara House, Corner of Dedan Kimathi Road and Independence Avenue, Lusaka
 Kalingalinga Branch: B4/29/146, Kamloops Road, Lusaka
 Garden Branch: 39 Katima Mulilo Road, Lusaka
 Industrial Branch: Blessing Center, Corner of Vubu Road and Lumumba Road, Emmasdale, Lusaka
 Mansa Branch: Corner of President Road and Chitimukulu Road, Mansa
 Mwense Branch: Office No 5, Community Development Block, Mwense
 Chipata Branch: 4769 Lunkhwakwa Road, Chipata
 Ndola Branch: 93 Z-Mart Mall, Shop No 7, President Avenue, Ndola
 Kitwe Branch: 33 Ebenezer Centre, Independence Ave, Kitwe
 Kitwe Agency: 1306 Chibuluma Road, Industrial Area, Kitwe
 Chingola Branch: ZRA Building, 11 Kitwe Road, Chingola
 Chililabombwe Branch: 151 Buntungwa Road, Industrial Area, Chililabombwe
 Mbala Branch: Independence Avenue, Mbala
 Mpulungu Branch: Harbour Road, Mpulungu
 Kasama Branch: Shoprite Centre, Independence Road, Kasama
 Solwezi Branch: Solwezi
 Mufumbwe Branch: 1 Main Street, Mufumbwe.

The Capricorn Group
 
Cavmont Bank is a member of the Capricorn Group of Companies under the umbrella of the parent company Capricorn Investment Holdings, a Namibia-based investment conglomerate. The Group has investment interests in southern Africa, as outlined in the graphic below:

  Zambia Cavmont Capital Holdings Zambia Plc. - 44.5% Shareholding
 Cavmont Bank Limited - 44.5% Shareholding

  Namibia Bank Windhoek Holdings Limited - 73% Shareholding
 Bank Windhoek Limited - 73% Shareholding
 BW Finance Limited - 73% Shareholding
 Welwitschia Nammic Insurance Brokers Limited - 56.7% Shareholding
 Namib BOU Limited - 73% Shareholding
 Santam Namibia Limited - 18.3%Shareholding
 Sanlam Namibia Holdings Limited - 21.5% Shareholding
 Nammic Financial Services Holdings - 100% Shareholding
 GH Group Employee Share Trust - 16.4% Shareholding

  Botswana'
 Capricorn Investment Holdings Botswana Limited - 94.9% Shareholding
 Bank Gaborone Limited - 94.9% Shareholding
 Ellwood Insurance Brokers limited - 94.9% Shareholding
 SmartSwitch Botswana Limited - 47.5% Shareholding
 Capricorn Asset Management Limited - 75.2% Shareholding
 Capricorn Capital Limited - 100% Shareholding
 Cyan ES Limited - 100% Shareholding

Governance
There are six members on the Board of Directors of Cavmont Bank:

 Guy D.Z. Phiri - Chairman
 Thinus Prinsool - Vice Chairman
 Chitupa Muzariri - Director
 Johan Swanepoel - Director
 Joseph Ngosa - Director
 Charles H de B Carey - Managing Director.

See also

References

External links
Capricorn Investment Holdings Acquires 44.5% Stake In Cavmont Capital Holdings Limited
Zambia: Cavmont Deposits Soar To K348 Million (US$56 Million)

Banks of Zambia
Companies based in Lusaka
Banks established in 2004
2004 establishments in Zambia